(3 July 1887 – 24 December 1924) was a Japanese yōga painter best known for his portraits of Sōma Toshiko including Girl, Shojo (1914).

Life
Nakamura Tsune was born in 1887 in what is now Mito City, into a family that had served as samurai in the Mito domain. His father died the following year, his mother when he was eleven.

That same year he was baptised. In 1908 he began to socialize with artists including Ogiwara Rokuzan at the  Atelier in Shinjuku. Two of his works, Cloudy Morning and Cliffs (now in the Museum of the Imperial Collections) featured in the Third Bunten Exhibition in 1909, the latter receiving a commendation.

In 1911 he moved into a studio behind the Nakamura-ya. The following year haemoptysis began. In 1913 Sōma Toshiko, daughter of Aizō and Kokkō, became his model. In 1914, Girl won a prize at the Eighth Bunten Exhibition. Later that year he visited Izu Ōshima. In 1915 his petition for the hand of Toshiko in marriage was opposed by her parents (she went on to marry Rash Behari Bose). His Portrait of Eroshenko was exhibited at the Second Teiten Exhibition in 1920.

In December 1924 at the age of 37 he died in his studio in Shimo-Ochiai.

Shinjuku Nakamura Tsune Atelier Memorial Museum
The  opened in Shinjuku in 2013. Admission to the museum is free.

See also

 List of Yōga painters

References

1887 births
1924 deaths
Japanese painters